KYCA (1490 AM "The News 1490") is a radio station broadcasting a talk radio format in Prescott, Arizona. It is owned by Jason Zinzileta and Janice Derks, through licensee Prescott Broadcasting, LLC.

KYCA is powered at 1,000 watts using a non-directional antenna.  It is also heard on FM translator K278CN at 103.5 MHz.

Programming
Weekdays carries local news and information program from 6 to 9 a.m. and 4 to 6 p.m.  The rest of the schedule is made up of nationally syndicated shows including Sean Hannity, Dan Bongino, Chris Plante, Charlie Kirk, John Batchelor, "This Morning, America's First News with Gordon Deal" and "America in the Morning."  Weekend syndicated shows include Lars Larson, "Jill on Money," Kim Komando, "The Pet Show with Warren Eckstein," Jim Bohannon and repeats of weekday shows.  World and national news comes from Fox News Radio.

Local shows include:  "KYCA AM," "KYCA Talks", "KYCA PM", "Tri-City Sports Round-Up," & "Healthline".

History
On , the station signed on the air.  KYCA has been serving Prescott, providing news and other programming to the rapidly growing area. An early slogan of KYCA was, "At 1490 since 1940". The station was originally part of the Arizona Radio Network and was owned by KTAR radio in Phoenix beginning in 1944.

The station was acquired by the Silverstein family in 1970. It was sold in 2017, after the death of Lou Silverstein, to Phoenix Radio Broadcasting.

KYCA became a network affiliate of the Fox News Radio Network and Westwood One, also carrying local news, sports, and other information. The station first began its transition to full-time news-talk radio with the premiere of The Rush Limbaugh Show in 1988 and The Dr. Dean Edell Show a few years later. The station has carried syndicated programs from Limbaugh, Laura Ingraham, Michael Savage, and Lars Larson.

KYCA has an FM translator at 103.5 MHz, which formerly broadcast on 97.1 MHz in Winslow.

Effective January 12, 2018, Southwest Broadcasting sold KYCA (as well as translator K278CN and sister station 102.1 KAHM and its translator K269EE) to Phoenix Radio Broadcasting, a holding company for the Cesar Chavez Foundation's Farmworker Educational Radio Network.

Effective May 19, 2021, Phoenix Radio Broadcasting sold KYCA and translator K278CN to Jason Zinzileta and Janice Derks' Prescott Broadcasting, LLC for $1.03 million.

References

External links

 

Talk radio stations in the United States
Radio stations established in 1940
Prescott, Arizona
YCA